is a Japanese manga series written and illustrated by Fuyumi Soryo. The story focuses on the developing relationship between Masaki, a delinquent and former basketball star, and Kanako, a girl with a heart condition that forces her to repeat two years of school.

In 1987, Boyfriend received the 33rd Shogakukan Manga Award for shōjo manga. On February 11, 1992, an anime adaptation produced by Magic Bus aired on TV Tokyo. In 2008, the manga was posted on Yahoo! Comic Japan's website for free browsing, in order to celebrate Shōjo Comic magazine's 40th anniversary.

Plot
Masaki Takatō is the second youngest of four sons, and seemingly a delinquent by nature. His hot temper has put a wedge between himself and his strict father, gotten him kicked out of one school, and tossed in another school which is notoriously horrible for the one thing he's truly good at—basketball. A chance encounter with the willful Kanako Yūki may serve as a catalyst for change, as the indefinable connection she feels with Masaki draws them together...

Characters

References

External links

1988 comics endings
1992 television films
1992 films
Animated films based on manga
Fuyumi Soryo
Manga adapted into films
Romance anime and manga
Shogakukan manga
Shōjo manga
TV Tokyo original programming
Winners of the Shogakukan Manga Award for shōjo manga
Magic Bus (studio)